The year 2014 is the 4th year in the history of the ONE Championship, a mixed martial arts promotion based in Singapore.

Tournament bracket

Cambodia Featherweight Grand Prix

ONE Cambodia Featherweight Grand Prix bracket

Beijing Featherweight Tournament

ONE Beijing Featherweight Tournament bracket

Beijing Flyweight Tournament

ONE Beijing Flyweight Tournament bracket

List of events

ONE Fighting Championship: War of Nations

ONE Fighting Championship: War of Nations (also known as ONE FC 14) was a mixed martial arts event held by ONE Championship. The event took take place on March 14, 2014 at the Stadium Negara in Kuala Lumpur, Malaysia

 Background

The event was the fourth visit of ONE to Malaysia, and the second to the Stadium Negara, after the  successful June 2012 Destiny of Warriors event.
The main event featured the inaugural bout for the ONE Welterweight Championship, between Nobutatsu Suzuki and Brock Larson. Due to missing weight, the women's rematch between Sherylin Lim and Ann Osman was cancelled.

Results

ONE Fighting Championship: Rise of Heroes

ONE Fighting Championship: Rise of Heroes (also known as ONE FC 15) was a mixed martial arts event held by ONE Championship. The event took place on May 2, 2014 at the SM Mall of Asia Arena in Pasay, Philippines

 Background

This was the fifth visit by ONE to the Philippines, and the fourth to the Mall of Asia Arena.

The main event featured the first title defense for ONE bantamweight champion Bibiano Fernandes against Masakatsu Ueda, the winner of the ONE Bantamweight Grand Prix.

The card also featured the debut of Philippine top boxer Jujeath Nagaowa against the returning Indian prospect Jeet Toshi.

Results

ONE Fighting Championship: Honor and Glory

ONE Fighting Championship: Honor and Glory (also known as ONE FC 16) was a mixed martial arts event held by ONE Championship.  The event took place on May 30, 2014 at the Singapore Indoor Stadium in Kallang, Singapore.

 Background
The event featured the debut of top American welterweight and former Bellator MMA champion Ben Askren.

A Bantamweight fight was scheduled between Ji Xian and Thanh Vu but the bout has been cancelled after Ji Xian failed to make the required bantamweight limit.

Results

ONE Fighting Championship: Era of Champions

ONE Fighting Championship: Era of Champions (also known as ONE FC 17) was a mixed martial arts event held by ONE Championship. The event took place on June 14, 2014 at the Mata Elang International Stadium in Jakarta, Indonesia.

Background 
In the main event, dynamic Brazilian striker Adriano Moraes and Japanese MMA veteran Kosuke "Rambo" Suzuki met in a featured Flyweight bout. Meanwhile, Indonesian MMA star Fransino Tirta faced Egyptian prospect Sami Amin in the co-headliner.

The winner of the Flyweight bout between Geje Eustaquio and Kentaro Watanabe will meet the winner of the main event between Adriano Moraes and Kosuke Suzuki in the inaugural ONE Flyweight Championship fight.

Results

ONE Fighting Championship: War of Dragons

ONE Fighting Championship: War of Dragons (also known as ONE FC 18) was a mixed martial arts event held by ONE Championship. The event took place on July 11, 2014 at the NTU Sports Center in Taipei, Taiwan.

Background

This marked the first visit of ONE to Taiwan. In the main event, Rob Lisita faced Eric "The Natural" Kelly for a shot at the ONE Featherweight Championship.

A lightweight bout between Zhang Zheng Jie and Rayner Kinsiong was scheduled but Zhang Zheng Jie failed his pre-fight medical exam and was unable to compete. Rayner Kinsiong failed to make the lightweight limit and instead faced Eilot Corley at a catchweight of 157 lb.

Results

ONE Fighting Championship: Reign of Champions

ONE Fighting Championship: Reign of Champions (also known as ONE FC 19) was a mixed martial arts event held by ONE Championship. The event took place on August 29, 2014 at the World Trade Centre in Dubai, United Arab Emirates.

Background

This event marked the first visit of ONE to the Emirates and also to the Middle East. The event was headlined by three title defenses, in the Featherweight, Lightweight and Welterweight divisions.

Results

ONE Fighting Championship: Rise of the Kingdom

ONE Fighting Championship: Rise of the Kingdom (also known as ONE FC 20) was a mixed martial arts event held by ONE Championship. The event took place on September 12, 2014 at the Koh Pich Theatre in Phnom Penh, Cambodia.

Background

This event marked the first visit of ONE to Cambodia. The event was headlined by the inaugural contest for the ONE Flyweight Championship, between Geje Eustaquio and Adriano Moraes.

Results

ONE Fighting Championship: Roar of the Tigers

ONE Fighting Championship: Roar of the Tigers (also known as ONE FC 21) was a mixed martial arts event held by ONE Championship. The event was held on October 17, 2014 at the Putra Indoor Stadium in Kuala Lumpur, Malaysia.

Background

ONE Championship returned to Malaysia, with this event headlined by the contest between top Featherweights Marat Gafurov and Rob Lisita.

Results

ONE Fighting Championship: Battle of Lions

ONE Fighting Championship: Battle of Lions (also known as ONE FC 22) was a mixed martial arts event held by ONE Championship. The event took place on November 7, 2014 at the Singapore Indoor Stadium in Kallang, Singapore.

Background

The main event crowned the inaugural ONE Middleweight World Champion, as Leandro Ataides faced Igor Svirid for the title.

Results

ONE Fighting Championship: Warrior's Way

ONE Fighting Championship: Warrior's Way (also known as ONE FC 23) was a mixed martial arts event held by ONE Championship. The event took place on December 5, 2014 at the SM Mall of Asia Arena in Pasay, Philippines.

Background

This event featured the debut of former UFC veteran Brandon Vera. His opponent is URCC Heavyweight Champion Igor Subora.

Results

ONE Fighting Championship: Dynasty of Champions (Beijing)

ONE Fighting Championship: Dynasty of Champions (Beijing) (also known as ONE FC 24) was a mixed martial arts event held by ONE Fighting Championship.  The event took place on December 19, 2014 in Beijing, China.

Background
This event marked the first visit of ONE to China.  The event was originally scheduled to take place on October 31, 2014 but the organization made the announcement to move it days leading up to the event. 

Results

See also
 2014 in UFC
 2014 in Absolute Championship Berkut
 2014 in Konfrontacja Sztuk Walki 
 2014 in Road FC 
 2014 in Kunlun Fight

References

External links
ONE Championship

ONE Championship events
ONE Championship events
2014 in mixed martial arts
2014 in kickboxing
2014-related lists